Julio Quintero (born 31 October 1964) is a Venezuelan footballer. He played in one match for the Venezuela national football team in 1987. He was also part of Venezuela's squad for the 1987 Copa América tournament.

References

External links
 

1964 births
Living people
Venezuelan footballers
Venezuela international footballers
Place of birth missing (living people)
Association football defenders
Zamora F.C. managers
Llaneros Escuela de Fútbol managers